The Helicoprionidae, also known as the Agassizodontidae are an extinct, poorly known family of bizarre holocephalids within the poorly understood order Eugeneodontida.  Members of the Helicoprionidae possessed a unique "tooth-whorl" on the symphysis of the lower jaw and pectoral fins supported by long radials.  The closest living relatives of the Helicoprionidae and all other eugeneodontids are the ratfishes. The anatomy of the tooth-whorl differed amongst genus and species, some possessing complete spirals (such as those of Helicoprion), others possessing halved spirals (seen in Parahelicoprion), and some with wedged half-spirals (seen in Sarcoprion). Each tooth-whorl is thought to be adapted to a different type of prey, and a different predation strategy.

References

External links
Palaeos Vertebrates 70.100 Chondrichthyes: Eugnathostomata at paleos.com
JSTOR: Journal of PaleontologyVol. 70, No. 1 (Jan., 1996), pp. 162-165
More about Chondrichthyes at Devonian Times

Mississippian first appearances
Early Triassic extinctions